Elbert "Scottie" Slayback (October 5, 1901 – November 30, 1979) was a second baseman in Major League Baseball. He played for the New York Giants.

References

External links

1901 births
1979 deaths
Hanover Raiders players
Major League Baseball second basemen
New York Giants (NL) players
Baseball players from Kentucky
Sportspeople from Paducah, Kentucky